{{DISPLAYTITLE:C11H17BrNO2}}
The molecular formula C11H17BrNO2 (molar mass: 258.11 g/mol) may refer to:

 4-Bromo-3,5-dimethoxyamphetamine
 2-Bromo-4,5-methylenedioxyamphetamine

Molecular formulas